Ze'ev Nachum Revach (born 15 August 1940) is an Israeli comedian, film and theatre actor, and filmmaker. He has been one of the stars of the Israeli film genre known as Bourekas films.

Israeli newspaper Haaretz described Revach's films as a "peculiarly Israeli genre of comic melodramas or tearjerkers... based on ethnic stereotypes that flourished [in Israel] in the 1960s and 1970s."

Some of his films, notably Hasamba, Hagiga B'Snuker, and Charlie Ve'hetzi developed a local cult following.

Early life
Revach was born in Morocco, to a family of Moroccan Jewish descent. He immigrated with his family to Israel in 1948, at the age of eight. Revach served as a combat soldier in the Israel Defense Forces, prior to his acting career in Tel Aviv. He studied at the Beit Zvi School for the Performing Arts.

Accolades
In 2000, Revach won the Israeli Film Academy's best actor award for his role as Shabtai Kassodas in Beitar Provence.

Revach was honored at the Cinema South festival held in Sderot in May 2010. The festival organizers, explaining their decision, said that "a renewed look at his movies shows that they are critical, subversive, Israeli and Mediterranean texts, both in form and in content."

Filmography
 The Farewell Party (2014) as Yehezkel
 The Last Warrior (2000) as 'Cooky'
 Delta Force One: The Lost Patrol (2000) as Youssef
 The Quest (1996) as Turkish Captain
 Escape: Human Cargo (1998) as Sheik Abdulla Fazza
 Ha-Muvtal Batito (1997) as Batito 
 Hagiga B'Snuker (1975) as Hannukah / 'Haham' Hannukah 
 Charlie Ve'hetzi (1974) as Sasson
 The Jerusalem File (1972) as Rashid
 Hasamba (1971) as Elimelech Zorkin
 La Battaglia Del Sinai (1968)

References

External links
 

1940 births
Living people
Israeli Sephardi Jews
Israeli Mizrahi Jews
Israeli male film actors
Israeli entertainers
Israeli male comedians
Israeli film directors
Beit Zvi School for the Performing Arts alumni
Moroccan emigrants to Israel
Israeli people of Moroccan-Jewish descent
People from Jerusalem